Mongolia participated in the 15th Asian Games, officially known as the XV Asiad held in Doha, Qatar from December 1 to December 15, 2006. Mongolia ranked 21st with two gold medals in this edition of the Asiad.

Medal summary

Medals by sport

Medalists

Boxing

Judo

Shooting

Wrestling

References

Nations at the 2006 Asian Games
2006
Asian Games